ArduPilot is an open source, unmanned vehicle Autopilot Software Suite, capable of controlling autonomous:
Multirotor drones
Fixed-wing and VTOL aircraft 
Helicopters
Ground rovers
Boats
Submarines
Antenna trackers
ArduPilot was originally developed by hobbyists to control model aircraft and rovers and has evolved into a full-featured and reliable autopilot used by industry, research organisations and amateurs.

Software and Hardware

Software suite 
The ArduPilot  software suite consists of navigation software (typically referred to as  firmware when it is compiled to binary form for microcontroller hardware targets)  running on the vehicle (either Copter, Plane, Rover, AntennaTracker, or Sub),  along with  ground station controlling software including Mission Planner, APM Planner, QGroundControl, MavProxy, Tower and others.

ArduPilot source code is stored and managed on GitHub, with almost 400 total contributors.

The software suite is automatically built nightly, with continuous integration and unit testing provided by Travis CI, and a build and compiling environment including the GNU cross-platform compiler and Waf.   Pre-compiled binaries running on various hardware platforms are available for user download from ArduPilot's sub-websites.

Supported hardware 
Copter, Plane, Rover, AntennaTracker or Sub software runs on a wide variety of embedded hardware (including full blown Linux computers),  typically consisting of one or more  microcontroller or microprocessor connected to peripheral sensors used for navigation. These sensors  include MEMS gyroscopes and  accelerometers at a minimum, necessary for multirotor flight and plane stabilization. Sensors  usually  include, in addition,  one or more compass, altimeter (barometric) and GPS, along with optional additional sensors such as optical flow sensors, airspeed indicators, laser or sonar altimeters or rangefinders, monocular, stereoscopic or RGB-D cameras. Sensors may be on the same electronic board, or external.

Ground Station software, used for programming or monitoring vehicle operation, is available for Windows, Linux, macOS, iOS, and Android.

ArduPilot runs on a wide variety of hardware platforms, including the following, listed in alphabetical order:        
Intel Aero (Linux or STM32 Base)
APM 2.X (Atmel Mega Microcontroller Arduino base), designed by Jordi Munoz in 2010. APM, for ArduPilotMega,  only runs on older versions of ArduPilot.
BeagleBone Blue and PXF Mini (BeagleBone Black cape).
The Cube, formerly called  Pixhawk 2, (ARM Cortex  microcontroller base), designed by ProfiCNC in 2015.
Edge , drone controller with video streaming system, designed by Emlid.
Erle-Brain , (Linux base) designed by Erle Robotics. 
Intel Minnowboard (Linux Base). 
Navio2 and Navio+ (Raspberry Pi Linux based), designed by Emlid.
Parrot Bebop, and Parrot C.H.U.C.K., designed by Parrot, S.A.
, (ARM Cortex  microcontroller base), originally designed by Lorenz Meier and ETH Zurich, improved and launched in 2013 by PX4, 3DRobotics, and the ArduPilot development team.
PixRacer,  (ARM Cortex  microcontroller base) designed by AUAV. 
Qualcomm SnapDragon (Linux base).
Virtual Robotics VRBrain (ARM Cortex  microcontroller base).
Xilinx SoC Zynq processor (Linux base, ARM and FPGA processor).
In addition to the above base navigation platforms, ArduPilot supports integration and communication with on-vehicle  companion, or auxiliary computers for  advanced navigation requiring more powerful processing. These include NVidia TX1 and TX2 ( NVidia Jetson architecture), Intel Edison and Intel Joule, HardKernel  Odroid, and Raspberry PI computers.

Features

Common to all vehicles 
ArduPilot provides a large set of features, including the following common for all vehicles:
Fully autonomous, semi-autonomous and fully manual flight modes, programmable missions with 3D waypoints, optional geofencing.
Stabilization options to negate the need for a third party co-pilot.
Simulation with a variety of simulators, including ArduPilot SITL.  
Large number of navigation sensors supported, including several models of RTK GPSs, traditional L1 GPSs, barometers, magnetometers,  laser and sonar rangefinders,  optical flow,  ADS-B transponder, infrared, airspeed, sensors, and computer vision/motion capture devices.
Sensor communication via SPI, I²C, CAN Bus, Serial communication, SMBus.
Failsafes for loss of radio contact, GPS and breaching a predefined boundary, minimum battery power level.
Support for navigation in GPS denied environments, with vision-based positioning, optical flow, SLAM,  Ultra Wide Band positioning.
Support for actuators such as parachutes and magnetic grippers.
Support for brushless  and brushed motors.
Photographic and video gimbal support and integration.
Integration and communication with powerful secondary, or "companion",  computers
Rich documentation through ArduPilot wiki.
Support and discussion through ArduPilot discourse forum, Gitter chat channels, GitHub, Facebook.

Copter-specific 
Flight modes: Stabilize, Alt Hold,  Loiter,  RTL (Return-to-Launch),  Auto, Acro, AutoTune, Brake, Circle, Drift, Guided, (and Guided_NoGPS), Land, PosHold, Sport, Throw, Follow Me, Simple, Super Simple, Avoid_ADSB.
Auto-tuning
Wide variety of frame types supported, including tricopters, quadcopters, hexacopters, flat and co-axial octocopters, and custom motor configurations
Support for traditional electric and gas helicopters, mono copters, tandem helicopters.

Plane-specific 
Fly By Wire modes, loiter, auto, acrobatic modes.
Take-off options:  Hand launch, bungee, catapult, vertical transition (for VTOL planes).
Landing options: Adjustable glide slope, helical, reverse thrust, net, vertical transition (for VTOL planes).
Auto-tuning, simulation with JSBSIM, X-Plane and RealFlight simulators.
Support for a large variety of VTOL architectures: Quadplanes, Tilt wings, tilt rotors, tail sitters, ornithopters.
Optimization of 3 or 4 channel airplanes.

Rover-specific 
Manual, Learning, Auto, Steering, Hold and Guided operational modes.
Support for wheeled and track architectures.

Submarine-specific 
 Depth hold: Using pressure-based depth sensors, submarines can maintain depth within a few centimeters.
 Light Control: Control of subsea lighting through the controller.
ArduPilot is fully documented within its wiki,  totaling the equivalent of about 700 printed pages and  divided in six top sections: The Copter, Plane, Rover, and Submarine vehicle related subsections are aimed at users.  A developer subsection for advanced uses is aimed primarily at software and hardware engineers, and a Common section regrouping information common to all vehicle types is shared within the first four sections.

ArduPilot use cases

Hobbyists and amateurs 
Drone racing.
Building and operation of radio control models for recreation.

Professional 
Aerial photogrammetry
Aerial photography and filmmaking.
Remote sensing
Search and rescue
Robotic applications
Academic research
Package delivery

History

Early years, 2007-2012 
The ArduPilot project earliest roots  date back to late 2007  when Jordi Munoz, who later co-founded 3DRobotics with Chris Anderson, wrote an Arduino  program (which he called "ArduCopter") to stabilize an RC Helicopter.  In  2009  Munoz and Anderson released Ardupilot 1.0 (flight controller software) along with a hardware board it could run on. That same year Munoz, who  had built a  traditional RC  helicopter UAV able to fly autonomously,  won  the first Sparkfun AVC competition. The project grew further thanks to many members of the DIY Drones community, including Chris Anderson who championed the project and had founded the forum based community earlier in 2007.

The first ArduPilot version supported only fixed-wing aircraft and was based on a thermopile sensor, which relies on determining the location of the horizon relative to the aircraft by measuring the difference in temperature between the sky and the ground. Later, the system was improved to replace thermopiles with an Inertial Measurement Unit (IMU) using a combination of accelerometers, gyroscopes and magnetometers.  Vehicle support was later expanded to other vehicle types which led to the Copter, Plane, Rover, and Submarine subprojects.

The years 2011 and 2012 witnessed an explosive growth in the autopilot functionality and codebase size, thanks in large part to new participation from  Andrew "Tridge" Tridgell and HAL author Pat Hickey. Tridge's contributions included automatic testing and simulation capabilities for Ardupilot, along with PyMavlink and Mavproxy.  Hickey was instrumental in bringing the AP_ HAL library to the code base: HAL (Hardware Abstraction Layer) greatly simplified and modularized the code base by introducing and confining low-level hardware implementation specifics to a separate hardware library. The year 2012 also saw Randy Mackay taking the role of lead maintainer of Copter, after a request from former maintainer Jason Short, and Tridge taking over the role of lead Plane maintainer, after Doug Weibel who went on to earn a Ph.D. in Aerospace Engineering. Both Randy and Tridge are current lead maintainers to date.

The free software approach to  ArduPilot code development is similar to that of the Linux Operating system and the GNU Project, and the PX4/Pixhawk and Paparazzi Project, where low cost and availability enabled  hobbyists   to build autonomous  small remotely piloted aircraft, such as micro air vehicles and miniature UAVs. The drone industry, similarly, progressively leveraged ArduPilot code to build professional, high-end autonomous vehicles.

Maturity, 2013-2016 
While early versions of ArduPilot used the APM flight controller, an AVR CPU running the Arduino open-source programming language (which explains the "Ardu" part of the project name), later years witnessed  a significant re-write of the code base in  C++ with many supporting utilities written in Python.

Between 2013 and 2014  ArduPilot  evolved to run on a range of hardware platforms and operating system beyond the original Arduino Atmel based microcontroller architecture, first with the commercial introduction of the Pixhawk  hardware flight controller, a collaborative effort between PX4, 3DRobotics and the ArduPilot development team,  and later to the Parrot's Bebop2 and the  Linux-based  flight controllers like Raspberry Pi based NAVIO2 and BeagleBone based ErleBrain.   A key  event within this time period included the first flight of a plane under Linux in mid 2014.

Late 2014  saw the formation of DroneCode, formed to bring together the leading open source UAV software projects, and most notably to solidify the relationship and collaboration of the ArduPilot and the PX4 projects.  ArduPilot's involvement with DroneCode ended in September 2016. 2015 was also a banner year for 3DRobotics, a heavy sponsor of ArduPilot development, with its introduction of the Solo quadcopter, an off the shelf quadcopter running ArduPilot.  Solo's  commercial success, however, was not to be.

Fall of 2015 again saw a key event in the history of the autopilot,  with a swarm of 50 planes running  ArduPilot simultaneously flown at the  Advanced Robotic Systems Engineering Laboratory (ARSENL) team at the Naval Postgraduate School.

Within this time period, ArduPilot's code base was significantly refactored, to the point where it ceased to bear any similarity to its early Arduino years.

Current, 2018- 
ArduPilot code evolution continues with support for integrating and communicating with powerful companion computers for autonomous navigation, plane support for additional VTOL architectures, integration with ROS, support for gliders, and tighter integration for submarines.  The  project evolves under the umbrella of ArduPilot.org, a project within the Software in the Public Interest (spi-inc.org) not-for-profit organisation.  ArduPilot is sponsored in part by a growing list of corporate partners.

UAV Outback Challenge

In 2012, the Canberra UAV Team successfully took first place in the prestigious UAV Outback Challenge. The CanberraUAV Team included ArduPlane Developers and the airplane flown was controlled by an APM 2 Autopilot.  In 2014 the CanberraUAV Team and ArduPilot took first place again, by successfully delivering a bottle to the "lost" hiker. In 2016 ArduPilot placed first in the technically more challenging competition, ahead of strong competition from international teams.

Community 
ArduPilot is jointly managed by a group of volunteers located around the world, using the Internet (discourse based forum, gitter channel) to communicate, plan, develop and support it. The development team meets weekly in a chat meeting, open to all, using Mumble. In addition, hundreds of users contribute ideas, code and documentation to the project. ArduPilot is licensed under the GPL Version 3 and is free to download and use.

Customizability 

The flexibility of ArduPilot makes it very popular in the DIY field but it has also gained popularity with professional users and companies. 3DRobotics' Solo quadcopter, for instance, uses ArduPilot, as have a large number of professional aerospace companies such as Boeing.  The flexibility allows for support of a wide variety of frame types and sizes, different sensors, camera gimbals and RC transmitters depending on the operator's preferences.

ArduPilot has been successfully integrated into many airplanes such as the Bixler 2.0. The customizability and ease of installation have allowed the ArduPilot platform to be integrated for a variety of missions. The Mission Planner (Windows) ground control station allows the user to easily configure, program, use, or simulate an ArduPilot board for purposes such as mapping, search and rescue, and surveying areas.

See also 
 Open-source robotics
Other projects for autonomous aircraft control:
 PX4 autopilot
 Paparazzi Project
 Slugs
Other projects for ground vehicles & cars driven:
 OpenPilot
 Tesla Autopilot

References

External links
ArduPilot.org

Unmanned aerial vehicles
Unmanned underwater vehicles
Free software
Robots
Unmanned ground vehicles